Fantasmagorie is a 1908 French animated film by Émile Cohl. It is one of the earliest examples of traditional (hand-drawn) animation, and considered by film historians to be the first animated cartoon.

Description 

The film largely consists of a stick man moving about and encountering all manner of morphing objects, such as a wine bottle that transforms into a flower which becomes an elephant. There are also sections of live action where the animator's hands enter the scene. The main character is drawn by the artist's hand on camera, and the main characters are a clown and a gentleman. Other characters include a woman in a film theater wearing a large hat with gigantic feathers and a strongman.

The film, in all of its wild transformations, is a direct tribute to the by-then forgotten Incoherent movement. The title is taken from the original French word for "phantasmagoria", a mid-19th century magic lantern show with moving images of ghosts.

History 

Cohl worked on Fantasmagorie from February to either May or June 1908. Despite the short running time, the piece was packed with material devised in a stream of consciousness style.  The film was released on 17 August 1908.

Production 
The film was created by drawing each frame on paper and then shooting each frame onto negative film, which gave the picture a blackboard look.  It was made up of 700 drawings, each of which was exposed twice (animated "on twos"), leading to a running time of almost two minutes.

Cohl probably copied the blackboard-style from J. Stuart Blackton's Humorous Phases of Funny Faces (1906).

See also 
 Humorous Phases of Funny Faces
 The Enchanted Drawing
 History of animation

References

External links 

 
 
 
 

1900s animated short films
1908 films
1908 animated films
French black-and-white films
French animated short films
Films directed by Émile Cohl
French short films
Articles containing video clips
French silent short films
Animated films without speech